The following list of Carnegie libraries in West Virginia provides detailed information on United States Carnegie libraries in West Virginia, where 3 public libraries were built from 3 grants (totaling $81,500) awarded by the Carnegie Corporation of New York from 1901 to 1907. In addition, one academic library was built.  Communities who rejected Carnegie grants often did so because they were unable to raise the 10 percent annual maintenance fee that Carnegie required or they did not have an adequate building site available. The towns of Bluefield and Williamson were both unable to provide a suitable building site for a new library. Leaders in the Charleston community did not think the Carnegie grant was substantial enough to build a library that would adequately serve their population. Officials at the time said Charleston "should have a more commodious library than $45,000 would erect." Carnegie refused to modify the award and a bond proposal to raise more funds in 1915 failed. In Wheeling, labor leaders ensured that the town would not receive a Carnegie award; they effectively boycotted the municipal bond levy due to the deaths of steelworkers at Carnegie's Homestead, Pennsylvania mill during the 1892 strike.

Key

Public libraries

Academic library

Notes

References

Note: The above references, while all authoritative, are not entirely mutually consistent. Some details of this list may have been drawn from one of the references without support from the others.  Reader discretion is advised.

West Virginia
Libraries
 
Libraries